Wellington Albert (born 3 September 1994) is a Papua New Guinean professional rugby league footballer who plays as a  for the London Broncos in the Championship and Papua New Guinea at international level.

He previously played for the North Wales Crusaders, Leeds Rhinos, Featherstone Rovers, Widnes Vikings and the Keighley Cougars.

Background
Albert was born in Mendi, Southern Highlands in Papua New Guinea. He is the elder brother of fellow PNG international Stanton Albert.

Playing career

Mendi Muruks
He played for the Mendi Muruks and the Lae Snax Tigers in the PNGNRL before being selected to represent Papua New Guinea at the 2013 World Cup.

PNG Hunters
On 12 December 2013, Albert was named in the Papua New Guinea Hunters' squad for their inaugural 2014 season in the Queensland Cup, though he later signed a two-year deal with the Penrith Panthers starting in 2014. He was the second Papua New Guinean player to be signed by an NRL club without having played junior rugby league in Australia.

Albert played 5 games for the Panthers' NYC team in 2014 before suffering a season-ending shoulder injury. In 2015, Albert moved into the Panthers' NSW Cup team.

Keighley Cougars
At the end of the 2020 championship Albert joined League 1 team, Keighley Cougars Prior to the start of the 2021 season he suffered a serious ankle injury in training which prevented him playing at all in 2021.

London Broncos
On 3 November 2021, it was reported that he had signed for London Broncos in the RFL Championship

International career
He played for the Kumuls in their pre-tournament match against Scotland, where he scored a try. His only match of the tournament was against New Zealand on 8 November 2013, where he again scored a try.

On 2 May 2015, he represented Papua New Guinea in the 2015 Melanesian Cup against Fiji. 

He is the largest man in the PNG pack standing at 196 cm tall and weighing in at 113 kilograms.

Personal life
In 2014, Albert started an economics degree at the University of Western Sydney. His brother Stanton has returned to Papua New Guinea from England  to play for the PNG Hunters team in the Queensland Cup in 2018.

Notes

References

External links

Leeds Rhinos profile
QRL profile
2017 RLWC profile
SL profile

1994 births
Living people
Featherstone Rovers players
Keighley Cougars players
Lae Bombers players
Leeds Rhinos players
London Broncos players
North Wales Crusaders players
Papua New Guinea Hunters players
Papua New Guinea national rugby league team players
Papua New Guinean expatriate rugby league players
Papua New Guinean expatriate sportspeople in the United Kingdom
Papua New Guinean rugby league players
People from the Southern Highlands Province
Rugby league props
Rugby league wingers
Widnes Vikings players